The 1933–34 Irish Cup was the 54th edition of the premier knock-out cup competition in Northern Irish football. 

Linfield won the tournament for the 18th time, defeating Cliftonville 5–0 in the final at The Oval.

Results

First round

|}

Replay

|}

Quarter-finals

|}

Semi-finals

|}

Final

References

External links
 Northern Ireland Cup Finals. Rec.Sport.Soccer Statistics Foundation (RSSSF)

Irish Cup seasons
1933–34 domestic association football cups
1933–34 in Northern Ireland association football